Sharafabad (also Romanized as Sharafābād; also known as Deh Kohneh-ye Mollā’ī) is a village in Kheyrgu Rural District, Alamarvdasht District, Lamerd County, Fars Province, Iran. At the 2006 census, its population was 124, in 31 families.

References 

Populated places in Lamerd County